"Wild & Free" is a song by German recording artist Lena Meyer-Landrut. It was written by Meyer-Landrut, Sarah Connor, Tim Myers, and production team Beatgees, and produced by the latter along with Myers for the soundtrack of the motion picture Fack ju Göhte 2 (2015). 

The song was released on 11 September 2015 as a digital single and later included on the deluxe version of Lena's Crystal Sky album.

Music video
A music video to accompany the release of "Wild & Free" was first released onto YouTube on 11 September 2015 at a total length of three minutes and fourteen seconds. The video has over 66 million views on YouTube.

Track listing

Charts

Weekly charts

Year-end charts

Certifications

Release history

References

External links
 

2015 singles
2014 songs
Lena Meyer-Landrut songs
Songs written by Sarah Connor (singer)
Polydor Records singles
Island Records singles
Songs written by Tim Myers
Songs written by Lena Meyer-Landrut